Authorize.Net, A Visa Solution is a United States-based payment gateway service provider, allowing merchants to accept credit card and electronic check payments through their website and over an Internet Protocol (IP) connection. Founded in 1996 as Authorize.Net, Inc., the company is now a subsidiary of Visa Inc. Its service permits customers to enter credit card and shipping information directly onto a web page, in contrast to some alternatives that require the customer to sign up for a payment service before performing a transaction.

History 

Authorize.Net was founded in 1996, in Utah, by Jeff Knowles. As of 2004, it had about 90,000 customers.

Authorize.Net was one of several companies acquired by Go2Net, a company backed by Microsoft founder Paul Allen, in 1999, for 90.5 million in cash and stock. Go2Net was acquired by InfoSpace in 2000 for about $4 billion; Authorize.Net was acquired by Lightbridge in 2004 for $82 million and then by CyberSource in 2007.

Visa Inc. acquired CyberSource in 2010 for $2 billion. Visa has maintained Authorize.Net and Cybersource as separate services, with Authorize.Net concentrating on small- to medium-sized businesses and Cybersource concentrating on international and large-scale payment processing. At the time of the 2010 acquisition, the company's CEO identified three priorities: expanding the ecommerce market, enhancing fraud detection and prevention, and improving data security. As of 2014, along with parent CyberSource, it had about 450,000 customers.

Outages
In September 2004, Authorize.Net's servers were hit by a distributed denial-of-service (DDoS) attack. The DDoS attack lasted for over one week and caused a virtual shut down of the payment gateway's service. The attackers demanded money from Authorize.net in exchange for stopping the attack.

On July 2, 2009, at 11:00 pm PST, the entire web infrastructure for Authorize.Net (main website, merchant gateway website, etc.) went offline and stayed down all morning July 3, 2009.  None of the over 200,000 merchants who used Authorize.Net payment gateway at the time were able to process credit cards. Authorize.Net's phone numbers were closed July 3 because of the July 4th holiday as previously announced on their website (though the website was down at the time).  Other companies that have nearby offices have reported to the media that there was a fire. Authorize.net started a Twitter account that morning, but did not update their phones to give notice to customers until July 5 when they reopened phones.

Services
Authorize.Net processes card and ACH payments for companies from small and medium-sized merchants. It offers fraud protection services, recurring billing subscriptions, and simple checkout options. For developers, it provides an application programming interface (API) and software development kits for Android and iOS. Its virtual terminal and invoice features can process manual payments. It also offers recurring billing and a plugin for the integration with Authorize.Net, and technical support is available for merchants.

Authorize.Net has the most customers of any payment processor and has been described as one of the more senior players in the payment processing industry, retaining a "decent portion" of the industry's market share.

See also
Electronic check
Merchant account
Shopping cart software

References

Visa Inc.
1999 mergers and acquisitions
2004 mergers and acquisitions
2007 mergers and acquisitions
1996 establishments in Utah
2007 disestablishments in Utah
Companies based in Utah
American companies established in 1996
American companies disestablished in 1999
Computer companies established in 1996
Computer companies disestablished in 1999
Defunct computer companies of the United States
Financial services companies established in 1996
Financial technology companies
Merchant services
Online payments